William MacMorine (1756–1832) was a Church of Scotland minister, who served as Moderator of the General Assembly in 1812.

Life

He was born on 7 May 1756 in the manse at Kirkpatrick Durham the son of Robert MacMorine, the parish minister. He was sent to study Divinity at Edinburgh University and licensed to preach by the Presbytery of Kirkcudbright in February 1791.

In March 1784 he was presented to the congregation of Caerlaverock Parish Church under patronage of William Duke of Queensberry in place of  James Kilpatrick. He was accepted by the congregation and ordained as their minister in August 1784. He spent his entire career of 48 years in this same position.

In December 1793 he was the minister called to Alloway by Robert Burns to christen his illegitimate daughter, Elizabeth Riddell, a task which most ministers resisted.

In 1811 Edinburgh University awarded him an honorary Doctor of Divinity. In 1812 he succeeded Alexander Ranken as Moderator of the General Assembly of the Church of Scotland the highest position in the Scottish church.

He died in Caerlaverock manse on 3 November 1832. His position at Caerlaverock was filled by Robert Gillies.

Publications

Account of the Parish of Caerlaverock

References
 

1756 births
1832 deaths
People from Dumfries and Galloway
Moderators of the General Assembly of the Church of Scotland
Robert Burns